Suzanne Hiram (born 10 August 1987) is a Nauruan weightlifter, three-time Oceania champion, and two-time Australian and Oceania champion.

She competed at the 2006 Commonwealth Games.

References

External links 
 Suzanne Hiram of Nauru attempts a lift in the Snatch category during the weightlifting Women's 48kg Final 

1987 births
Living people
Nauruan female weightlifters
Commonwealth Games competitors for Nauru
Weightlifters at the 2006 Commonwealth Games